The Association of Technical, Administrative and Supervisory Staff is a trade union in Trinidad and Tobago with the bulk of its members in the former Caroni (1975) Ltd, the state owned sugar industry that closed in July 2003.

See also

 List of trade unions

Trade unions in Trinidad and Tobago